Willowdale is a federal electoral district in Toronto, Ontario, Canada. It has been represented in the House of Commons of Canada since 1979. It is the riding with the biggest Korean community in Canada. As per the 2021 census, 9.9% of the population of Willowdale is Korean.

For a long time this riding was considered a Liberal stronghold, having been won by the Liberal Party of Canada in all but one election since 1980. Longtime Liberal MP Jim Peterson was the riding's MP from 1980 to 1984 and from 1988 to 2007, and Martha Hall Findlay was the riding MP from 2008 to 2011. Long considered a safe Liberal seat, Conservative candidate Chungsen Leung won by 932 votes on the May 2, 2011 federal election. In the 2015 federal election, the seat returned to the Liberal Party with Ali Ehsassi unseating Leung. This district is home to some landmarks like Mel Lastman Square, the Toronto Centre for the Arts and the Claude Watson School for the Arts.

Geography
Consisting of that part of the City of Toronto described as follows: commencing at the intersection of the northerly limit of said city with Bayview Avenue; thence southerly along said avenue to Highway No. 401; thence generally southwesterly along said highway to the Don River West Branch; thence generally northwesterly along said branch to Bathurst Street; thence northerly along said street to the northerly limit of said city; thence easterly along said limit to the point of commencement.

The riding contains the neighbourhoods of Willowdale, Lansing, Newtonbrook and North York Centre.

Demographics
''According to the Canada 2021 Census; 2013 representation

Languages: 29.4% English, 12.3% Mandarin, 9.2% Iranian Persian, 8.3% Korean, 6.7% Yue, 4% Russian, 3.2% Tagalog, 1.8% Spanish, 1.3% Arabic, 1.1% Italian, 1% Hindi, 1% Persian
Religions: 38.6% No religion, 38.5% Christian (17.5% Catholic, 3.9% Christian Orthodox, 2% Presbyterian, 1.3% Anglican, 1% United Church), 10.9% Muslim, 4.5% Jewish, 4% Hindu, 2.5% Buddhist 
Median income (2020): $37,200 
Average income (2020): $55,050

As per the 2021 Census, Willowdale has highest percentage of ethnic Iranians (8.9%) and ethnic Koreans (9.4%) of all City of Toronto ridings, and is one of the only four ridings with Chinese being the most frequent ethnic origin. In the same vein, it is the City of Toronto riding with the highest percentage of people belonging to the West Asian (11%) and Korean (9.9%) visible minorities.

Ethnicity groups: White: 28.7%, Chinese: 25.3%, West Asian: 11%, Korean: 9.9%, South Asian: 7.6%, Filipino: 6.5%, Black: 2.4%, Latin American: 2%, Arab: 1.4%, Southeast Asian: 1.3%

Ethnic origins: Chinese 22.9%, Korean 9.4%, Iranian 8.9%, Filipino 5.9%, Indian 4.8%, English 3.9%, Russian 3.8%, Italian 3.5%, Irish 3.4%, Canadian 3.2%

History
The riding was created in 1976 from part of Eglinton, York North and York Centre.

Willowdale consisted initially of the part of the Borough of North York bounded on the north by the borough limit (Steeles Avenue), on the West by the West Branch of the Don River and Bathurst Street, on the south by Highway 401, and on the east by Bayview Avenue.

In 1987, it was redefined to consist of the part of the City of North York bounded on the north by the borough limits (Steeles Avenue), and on the east, south and west by a line drawn from the borough limit southeast along the Don River West Branch, south along Bayview Avenue, east along Finch Avenue East, south along the Don River East Branch, west along Highway 401, and northwest along the Don River West Branch to the borough limit.

In 1996, it was redefined to consist of the part of the City of North York bounded on the north by the borough limits (Steeles Avenue), and on the east, south and west by a line drawn from the borough limit south along the eastern limit of the city, west along the hydro-electric transmission line situated south of McNicoll Avenue, south along Highway 404, west along Finch Avenue East, south along the Don River East Branch, west along Highway 401, northwest along the Don River West Branch, north along Bathurst Street, east along Drewry Avenue, north along Chelmsford Avenue, west along Greenwin Village Road, and north along Village Gate to the northern city limit.

In 2003, it was redefined to consist of that part of the City of Toronto described as follows: commencing at the intersection of the northerly limit of said city with Victoria Park Avenue; thence southerly along said avenue to the hydroelectric transmission line situated northerly of Apache Trail; thence southwesterly along said transmission line to Highway No. 404; thence southerly along said highway to Finch Avenue East; thence generally westerly along said avenue to Leslie Street; thence southerly along said street to Highway No. 401; thence generally southwesterly along said highway to the Don River West Branch; thence generally northwesterly along said branch to Bathurst Street; thence northerly along said street to the hydroelectric transmission line situated northerly of Finch Avenue West; thence generally easterly along said transmission line to Yonge Street; thence northerly along said street to the northerly limit of said city; thence easterly along said limit to the point of commencement.

This riding lost territory (36%) to Don Valley North, and gained territory from York Centre (16%) during the 2012 electoral redistribution.  The reduction in land area of the riding was primarily facilitated by substantial population growth along Yonge Street where the on-going redevelopment of land into additional high-rise residential buildings continued with medium-density development (low-rise residential buildings and townhomes) occurring slightly further from Yonge Street and along Sheppard and Finch Avenues.  The portion of the City of Toronto north of Highway 401 and east of Victoria Park Avenue (the former boundary with Scarborough) was allocated an additional riding now having five ridings versus the previous four.

Former boundaries

Members of Parliament

This riding has elected the following Members of Parliament:

Election results

 		 	 

|align="left" colspan=2|Liberal hold
|align="right"|Swing
|align="right"| +3.1
|align="right"|

|- bgcolor="white"

|align="left" colspan=2|Liberal hold
|align="right"|Swing
|align="right"| -7.7
|align="right"|

		
Note: Conservative vote is compared to the total of the Canadian Alliance vote and Progressive Conservative vote in 2000 election.
	

					
Note: Canadian Alliance vote is compared to the Reform vote in 1997 election.

See also
 List of Canadian federal electoral districts
 Past Canadian electoral districts

References

Notes

External links
Riding history from the Library of Parliament
 2011 results from Elections Canada
 Campaign expense data from Elections Canada

Federal electoral districts of Toronto
North York
Ontario federal electoral districts
1976 establishments in Ontario